Chahardangeh-ye Jonubi Rural District is in Chahardangeh District of Hurand County, East Azerbaijan province, Iran. Its constituent parts were in the former Hurand District of Ahar County. After Hurand District was separated to form Hurand County, the former Chahardangeh Rural District was made a district and divided into two rural districts. The center of Chahardangeh-ye Jonubi is the village of Kuran, with 403 people at the 2016 census.

References 

Rural Districts of East Azerbaijan Province

Populated places in East Azerbaijan Province

fa:دهستان چهاردانگه جنوبی